International University of Korea is a private university located in Jinju, South Korea.

Established in 1978 and later as Jinjun International University, the post secondary institution was renamed the current named in 2008.

The university is made up of seven colleges and 27 departments with total enrollment at 5,000.

IUK offers studies in Korean and English attracting mostly students from Asia (China, Japan, Mongolia, Vietnam, Philippines, Sri Lanka) as well as from Australia, Canada, United States and Turkey.

Getting to IUK

The university is accessible by car from Jinju using National Highway 10 (Namhae Expressway).

The closest airports are Sacheon Airport (domestic) and Gimhae International Airport (International).

Faculties

There are 27 departments at IUK:

 Early Childhood Education
 Elementary Special Education
 Physical Education
 Tourism and Japanese
 Hotel and Tourism Management
 Business Administration
 Police Administration
 Social Welfare (Social Work)
 Korean Language and Cultural Studies
 Nursing Sciences
 Physical Therapy
 Radiological Sciences
 Hospital Management
 Food Sciences
 Food and Nutrition
 Food and Culinary Services
 Mechanical and Automotive Engineering
 Fire and Disasters Prevention
 Interior Architecture (Design)
 Electrical Engineering
 Shipbuilding (Marine Engineering)
 Beauty Studies
 Sports
 Arts
 Music

Campus

IUK is located in a suburban area of Jinju and consists of several buildings

 Integrative Engineering Building
 Biotech Building
 Social Sciences Building
 Education and Science Building
 Sangmun Gymnasium
 Arts Building
 Transportation Engineering Building
 Health and Welfare Building
 International Studies Building
 Administration
 Library
 Football Stadium
 Dorms

References

External links
 IUK English site

Jinju
Private universities and colleges in South Korea
Universities and colleges in South Gyeongsang Province
Educational institutions established in 1978
1978 establishments in South Korea